Monument is a census-designated place and unincorporated community in Lea County, New Mexico, United States. Its population was 206 as of the 2010 census. Monument has a post office with ZIP code 88265. State routes 8 and 322 intersect in the community. It was the first inhabited community in Lea County and was named after nearby Monument Spring. Jim Cook established the post office and a general store.

Demographics

Education
It is in Hobbs Public Schools. Hobbs High School is the zoned comprehensive high school.

References

Census-designated places in New Mexico
Unincorporated communities in Lea County, New Mexico
Census-designated places in Lea County, New Mexico
Unincorporated communities in New Mexico